Assaroe Falls, also known as Cathaleen’s Falls, was a waterfall on the River Erne near Ballyshannon, County Donegal, Ireland. It was named after Aodh Ruadh, who according to tradition, slipped and fell from the waterfall and drowned.

Known for its beauty and famous salmon leap, the water was diverted for construction of the Cathaleen's Fall hydroelectric power station that was built in the town in the late 1940s and early 1950s. A dam was constructed upriver, known as Assaroe Lake, with a channel to lower the riverbed through the town to increase the head of water at the dam in order to drive the turbines.

There is a campaign to restore the historic salmon leap at Assaroe Falls.

Annalistic references

 M836.17. A slaughter was made of the foreigners at Eas Ruaidh.

Citations

References
 Twiss, Richard (1775), A Tour in Ireland
 Ireland Illustrated entry, National University of Ireland, Galway
 Annals of the Four Masters; The Age of Christ, 836

Waterfalls of the Republic of Ireland
Protected areas of County Donegal
Landforms of County Donegal
Republic of Ireland–United Kingdom border